The Feather of Finist the Falcon or Finist the Falcon is a Russian fairy tale collected by Alexander Afanasyev in Narodnye russkie skazki. It is Aarne–Thompson type 432, the prince as bird. Other tales of this type include The Green Knight, The Blue Bird, and The Greenish Bird.

Synopsis
A merchant asked his three daughters what they want him to bring them from the fair. The older two ask for dresses or shawls, but the youngest wants either the feather of Finist the Falcon or a red flower. In some variants, he went to the fair twice, able to bring back what her older sisters had asked for, but not hers, but she did not vary her request. In the third or first visit, he found the feather, or else found the flower and must promise that his daughter will marry Finist the Falcon for it. Whether the flower or the feather, the thing brought Finist the Falcon to her at night, and he wooed her. If she was given the flower, he gave her a feather that would magically aid her.

Her sisters discovered the visit; they might have spied, or she may have appeared in finer clothing, from use of the feathers, than they knew she had, or she may have appeared in church as a strange woman (like Cinderella at the ball) because of her rich clothing, and not hidden it quickly enough when she returned home. Once they became suspicious, they often listened and, hearing a man's voice, tried to persuade their father that their sister had a lover, but failed. However they discovered it, the sisters put knives in the window, so that he was injured. He said that she must search for him to find him, which would wear out three pairs of iron shoes, and three iron staves. He did not return. She sets out to find him.

She finds a hut with a witch (sometimes referred to as a Baba Yaga), who gives her a gift (such as a silver spinning wheel and a golden spindle), and sends her on to another witch. This witch gives her another gift (such as a silver dish and a golden egg), and sends her on to yet a third witch. This one gives her a third gift (such as a golden embroidery frame and a needle that sewed of itself), and sent her to the castle where Finist was to marry.

In some variants, she found someone trying to wash the blood from Finist's shirt and washed it herself. In all, she managed to trade the witches' gifts to the bride to let her stay a night with Finist. The princess either put a magical pin in his hair to keep him asleep or gave him a sleeping draught; the third night, either Finist is warned not to drink the draught, or the pin falls out. He woke and knew her.

In some variants, he asked the nobles whom he should marry: the woman who had sold him, or the woman who had bought him. They agreed the woman who bought him should have him.

In other variants, she went home to her father. When he and her sisters went to church, she dressed finely and went with Finist, and her sisters came back with stories of the prince and princess who came to church. The third time, her father saw the carriage stopped at his own door, and the daughter had to confess. She married Finist.

Translations
The tale was translated as The Little Feather of Finist the Bright Falcon by Robert Nisbet Bain;<ref>Polevoĭ, Petr; Bain, Robert Nisbet. Russian Fairy Tales: From the Skazki of Polevoi. Chicago: Way & Williams, 1895. pp. 188-199.</ref> as The Bright-Hawk's Feather by Nathan Haskell Dole, and as Fenist the Bright-Eyed Falcon by James Riordan.

Analysis
Tale type
The tale is classified in the international Aarne-Thompson-Uther Index as type ATU 432, "The Prince as Bird". In Russia, particularly, the tale type is known as Finist iasnyi sokol ("Finist the Bright Falcon), - also the name of type SUS 432 of the East Slavic Folktale Classification.

Russian researcher Varvara Dobrovolskaya stated that type SUS 432 figures among some of the popular tales of enchanted spouses in the Russian tale corpus.

The falcon prince's name
James Riordan suggested that the name Fenist was a corruption of the name Phoenix. In the same vein, scholar Andreas Johns states that the name Finist (and variations) is a corruption of the mythological phoenix (in Russian, feniks), brought into the folklore of Rus' by an external source, possibly written.

Variants
The East Slavic Folktale Classification, last updated in 1979 by folklorist , registers variants only in Russia.

Russia
Professor Jack V. Haney stated that the tale first appeared in printed form in 1795, with the title "Сказка о финифтяном пёрушке ясного сокола"."Старая погудка на новый лад: Русская сказка в изданиях конца XVIII века". Б-ка Рос. акад. наук. Saint Petersburg: Тропа Троянова, 2003. pp. 159-163. Полное собрание русских сказок; Т. 8. Ранние собрания.

Dobrovolskaya also remarks that in regional variants from Karelia, Murmansk and Arkhangelsk, type 432 sometimes merges with type 425A, "The Search for the Lost Husband", where the heroine receives gifts from the witches (Yagas) and uses them to buy from a false bride three nights in her husband's bed.

 Regional tales 
Folklorist Jeremiah Curtin translated a Russian variant from Vologda with the title The Feather of Bright Finist the Falcon. In this version, the third daughter asks for a red flower, which acts as the object that summons "Bright Finist the Falcon of Flowery Feathers". Her father finds the flower and gives it to his third daughter, with a reminder that the flower was a wedding gift from Finist himself. That night, the girl is visited by Finist, who flies in through her window. At dawn, before he departs, Finist gives the girl one of his feathers. At three consecutive Sundays, the girl's family goes to mass, and she, at home, uses Finist's feather to create beautiful dresses for her to go to church with. The sisters overhear a secret conversation between the lovers and place knives by the window. Finist flies in, hurts his foot, and rushes back to his kingdom. After days of his absence, the girl decides to go after him. On her journey, the heroine learns that Finist has been betrothed to a Tsar's daughter, and meets three Baba Yagas in their chicken-legged huts. Each Baba Yaga gives the heroine a gift: the first, a golden hammer and diamond nails; the second, a golden plate with a diamond ball; and the third, her quick steed. The heroine uses the gifts to buy three nights with her husband from the Tsar's daughter (the false bride).

Russian folklorist  collected a tale from Nizhny Novgorod with the title "Финист-ясен сокол" ("Finist - Bright Falcon"). In this tale, a father is going to the bazaar and asks his three daughters what he can buy them. The elder asks for a handkerchief, the middle one for earring and the youngest, named Mashenka, for Finist-Bright Falcon. The father finds his youngest daughter  a falcon: he remains a bird by day, and a human by night. Her sisters begin to hate the bird, and Finist decides to fly back to his kingdom to bring gifts for her. He flies and returns, but loses most of his feathers and has to fly back. Mashenka goes out of the door and tries to call him out with a song. Finist goes back and brings gifts for Mashenka.

In a tale from Pudozh titled "Про Филиста" ("About Filist"), a pair of siblings live with their father. The brother lulls his sister to sleep by singing a song about a future suitor for her: Filist, the Bright Falcon. She grows up and questions her brother about this Filist, but the brother, now older, dismisses it as a figment of his childhood. He goes to heat up the bath house and an old man tells him how his sister can find Filist: she is to follow three horses that will lead her to Filist. The horses stop by a barn, everything unlit inside. The girl finds a hut in the back of the property and meets a witch there. The witch tells her that Filist is indeed handsome, with hair of gold and silver, and gives her some matches to see him at night. The girl goes to the barn and lights up the matches to see him, but a spark falls in his hair and he disappears. The girl goes back to the witch in the backyard and she admonishes the girl, for now she has to endure three years of searching with iron boots, iron canes, iron bread. The girl goes to a smith to fashion the iron accessories and begins her quest. She goes to the huts of the witch's sisters, and gain from each a golden object: a golden reel, a golden spinning wheel, and a golden spindle. At last she finds Filist, but he is under the power of the Yaghi-Baba and bribes her with the golden objects for three nights with him. Despite the name of the male character, typical of Russian type 432, the compiler noted that the tale was closer to type 425A.

Komi people
In a variant from the Syryenen/Komi people titled Der falke Pipilysty ("The Falcon Pipilysty"), collected in Kortkeros, a rich merchant asks his three daughters what they want as gifts. The elder two ask for shoes and a headscarf, while the youngest asks for the Falcon Pipilysty. The merchant does not find the bird in the first two journeys, but on the third be brings home the Falcon Pipilysty. While her sisters go to church, the bird becomes a human youth and he gives her beautiful clothes to go to church. One day, the girl burns Falcon Pipilysty's birdskin, and he disappears beyond the mountains. She has to go after him, and brings with her a spool of golden thread, yarns of silk and a golden frame. She reaches a meadow where a hut is located, and finds her husband there, living in the hut with a joma. The girl uses the three objects to bribe the joma for three nights with her husband. On the first two nights, she tries to wake him up by recounting her arduous journey so far, but he does not flinch. On the third night, the husband awakes and escapes with the girl.

Perm
In a tale from Perm Krai with the title "Фифилисто ясно перышко" ("Fifilist, Bright Feather"), a father wants to gift his three daughters presents, and the youngest asks for Fifilist Bright Feather. The man does not seem to find the object on the first two trips, only on the third. After the girl gets Fifilist Bright Feather, she summons him by her window with a song and he comes to give her beautiful dresses to go to church with. The girl goes to church twice and is not recognized by her sisters, but on the third time she tells them she was the girl in beautiful dresses. On the fourth time, the sister place scissors by the window, Fifilist is hurt by the blades and flies back to wherever he comes from. The girl decides to go after him and meets Baba Yaga in her hut. Baba Yaga gives the heroine three eggs and three bowls, one of copper on the first time, silver on the second and gold on the third, and advises her to trade them for three nights with Fifilist, who is living with Baba Yaga's daughters.

In a tale from Perm Gubernia with the title "СКАЗКА О ДУНЬКЕ-ДУРКЕ И ЯСНОМ СОКОЛЕ" ("The Tale of Dunka-Durka and the Bright Falcon"), an old man and an old woman live with their three daughters, the youngest, Dunka, called a fool by the elder two. One day, their father goes to the market and asks his daughters what he can buy them: the elder asks for a riboon, the middle one for a handkerchief, and Dunka for Bright Falcon. The man gets a feather of Bright Falcon to Dunka. One day, the Bright Falcon flies in to Dunka's room and gives her beautiful dresses she wears to go to church. Eventually, Dunka's sisters discover the Bright Falcon's clandestine visits to their sister, and place knives on the windowsill. The next time the bird comes in, he pricks his body on the blades and injures himself, then flies back whence he came. When Dunka enters her room, she sees the blood on the window and decides to go after him. Dunka passes by the huts of three Baba Yagas: the first Baba Yaga tells the girl how the Bright Falcon is getting married to the granddaughter of the third Baba Yaga; the second gives the girl a golden preshenka (spinning wheel), a silver spindle and a golden pail and jug, and advises her to use the objects to trade for three nights with the third Baba Yaga's granddaughter. Dunka fails on the first two nights, but manages on the third one; the Bright Falcon wakes up and escapes with the girl from Baba Yaga's granddaughter's clutches.

Karelia
In a Russian-language tale from Vodlozero with the title "Марья-запечница" ("Marya-Zapechnitsa"), a merchant has three daughters, Anna, Tanya and Marya-Zapechnitsa, who sits by the stove. One day, he is ready to go on a business trip, and asks his daughters what gifts he can bring them: the elder asks for silk, the middle one for cashmere, and Marya asks for Philist, the Bright Falcon. The merchant brings home their presents. Some time later, Marya's sisters go to church on a Sunday, but she says home. After they leave, Philist gives Marya fine clothes for her to go to church. Marya goes and her sister do not recognize her. On the third Sunday, Marya goes to church and forgets her ring there, which her sisters recognize as belonging to her. Anna and Tanya take Philist away from her and the bird flies away. Marya then decides to look for him. She wanders off until she reaches a hut on chicken legs and meets its owner, an old woman. The woman gives her a golden spindle and a spinning wheel, and tells her to seek a nearby old lady named Egibaba with her two daughters, and trade the objects for one night with Philist. Marya trades the spindle with Egibaba's daughters, enter Philist's room and tries to wake him up, to no avail, since he was given a soporific wine. The next night, she trades the spinning wheel and manages to wake him up.

Bulgaria
Variants of type 432 also exist in the Bulgarian Folktale Catalogue with the name Сокол съпруг ("Falcon husband"), which reference Finist as the bird prince.

Adaptations
FilmFinist, the brave Falcon (Финист - Ясный сокол) (1976), Soviet Slavic fantasy adventure film directed by Gennadi Vasilyev. The Falcon (1990), children's film written and co-directed by Greg Palmer. The first co-production between the US and Soviet Georgia, with a film crew from Seattle shooting alongside locals in the Caucasus Mountains. It was aired on television as part of the 1990 Goodwill Games.The Phoenix Feather Alexandre Alexeieff and Claire Parker, (1974) animation on pinboard with chiaroscuro effect, 12 minutes, Black and White, part of European Folk Tales series produced by Max Massimino Garnier and John Halas for the Internation Animated Film Association 1971-1980, shown on Granada TV in UK and worldwide in 1980s.

Literature
Josepha Sherman drew on this fairy tale for her novel The Shining Falcon.
Andrei Platonov adapted the tale as Finist the Falcon Prince.
James Riordan retold the tale as Fenist the Falcon.

See also

Beauty and the Beast
Black Bull of Norroway
East of the Sun and West of the Moon
The Canary Prince
The Enchanted Pig
The Scarlet Flower
The Singing, Springing Lark
The Three Sisters
The Two Kings' Children
The White Bird and His Wife

References

Further reading
 Dobrovolskaya, V. E. "The Fairy Tale Finist the Bright Falcon (CIP 432) in the Russian folklore tradition and literature". In: Traditional culture''. 2019. Vol. 20. No. 5. pp. 113−127. DOI: 10.26158/TK.2019.20.5.009 (In Russian)

External links
 The Tale of Finist the Falcon

Russian fairy tales
Fairy tales collected by Alexander Afanasyev
Fiction about shapeshifting
Witchcraft in fairy tales
ATU 400-459